David Martin Baker (October 11, 1923 Clarksburg, Harrison County, WV - April 27, 2010) was a Republican member of West Virginia State House of Delegates from Cabell County, 1953, 1957–58, with defeats in 1954 and 1958. In 1967 he was the vice-chair of West Virginia Republican Party. He lived in Huntington, Cabell County, West Virginia.

Biographical information
Baker served in the U.S. Army Air Force in World War II. He was a lawyer and served as a judge on the West Virginia Court of Claims (1990–2005).He was named a fellow of the West Virginia Bar Foundation in 2004 and served as president of the Lawyer-Pilots Bar association. Additionally he was a member of the American Legion, the Elks, and Phi Delta Phi. He was among a few Jewish members ever serving in the West Virginia Legislature.

References

1923 births
20th-century American lawyers
Republican Party members of the West Virginia House of Delegates
Politicians from Huntington, West Virginia
Politicians from Clarksburg, West Virginia
2010 deaths
Jewish American military personnel
Jewish American state legislators in West Virginia
21st-century American Jews
Lawyers from Huntington, West Virginia
Lawyers from Clarksburg, West Virginia
Military personnel from Clarksburg, West Virginia